Priidu Beier (pseudonyms: Matti Moguči, Pierre Bezuhhov; born 16 October 1957 in Tartu) is an Estonian poet and teacher. He has edited several publications and is also a member of the Estonian Writers' Union and Estonian Literary Society. Between 1984–1990 he was the Head of the Pedagogical arts sector of Tartu Art Museum. In 2007 he presented a poetry collection in Tartu with Kerti Tergem. According to Tartu Postimees, Beier lives like a monk. He teaches art history at the Hugo Treffner Gymnasium in Tartu.

Selected works
 Vastus (1986)
 Tulikiri (1989)
 Mustil päevil (1991)
 Femme fatale (1997)
 Maavalla keiser (2000)
 Saatmata kirjad (2007)

References

External links
 Priidu Beier at Estonian Writers' Online Dictionary

1957 births
Living people
Estonian male poets
Writers from Tartu
20th-century Estonian poets
21st-century Estonian poets
University of Tartu alumni